The Rusher Hotel, also known as the Great Southern Hotel, is a historic hotel building at 127 West Cedar Street in Brinkley, Arkansas.  It was built in 1915 to serve the Brinkley Union Station.  It is a three-story brick building, whose main entrance originally faced the railroad, but was reoriented to the street facade after the railroad declined in importance.

The building was listed on the National Register of Historic Places in 1986, and is a contributing property to the Lick Skillet Railroad Work Station Historic District.

See also
National Register of Historic Places listings in Monroe County, Arkansas

References

Hotel buildings on the National Register of Historic Places in Arkansas
Hotel buildings completed in 1915
Railway hotels in the United States
Buildings and structures in Monroe County, Arkansas
St. Louis Southwestern Railway
Chicago, Rock Island and Pacific Railroad
National Register of Historic Places in Monroe County, Arkansas
Historic district contributing properties in Arkansas